Foreign trade in India includes all imports and exports to and from India. At the level of Central Government it is administered by the Ministry of Commerce and Industry. Foreign trade accounted for 48.8% of India's GDP in 2018.

History

Even before independence, the Government of India maintained semi-autonomous diplomatic relations. It had colonies (such as the Aden Settlement), who sent and received full missions, and was a founder member of both the League of Nations and the United Nations. After India gained independence from the United Kingdom in 1947, it soon joined the Commonwealth of Nations and strongly supported independence movements in other colonies, like the Indonesian National Revolution. The partition and various territorial disputes, particularly that over Kashmir, would strain its relations with Pakistan for years to come. During the Cold War, India adopted a foreign policy of non-alignment policy itself with any major power bloc. However, India developed close ties with the Soviet Union and received extensive military support from it.

Around 100CE
The Periplus of the Erythraean Sea is a document written by an anonymous sailor from Alexandria about 100CE describing trade between countries, including India.

Around 1500
In 1498 Portuguese explorer Vasco da Gama landed in Calicut (modern day Kozhikode in Kerala) as the first European to ever sail to India. The tremendous profit made during this trip made the Portuguese eager for more trade with India and attracted other European navigators and tradesmen.

Pedro Álvares Cabral left for India in 1500 and established Portuguese trading posts at Calicut and Cochin (modern day Kochi), returning to Portugal in 1501 with pepper, ginger, cinnamon, cardamom, nutmeg, mace, and cloves.  The profits made from this trip were huge.

1991 economic reform
Prior to the 1991 economic liberalisation, India was a closed economy due to the average tariffs exceeding 200 percent and the extensive quantitative restrictions on imports. Foreign investment was strictly restricted to only allow Indian ownership of businesses. Since the liberalisation, India's economy has improved mainly due to increased foreign trade.

Trade in services
India was the eighth largest exporter of commercial services in the world in 2016, accounting for 3.4% of global trade in services. India recorded a 5.7% growth in services trade in 2016–17.

Exports and imports

India exports approximately 7500 commodities to about 190 countries, and imports around 6000 commodities from 140 countries.

Trade statistics
Summary table of recent India foreign trade (in billion $):

The top 10 commodity exports in 2007 were as follows:

The top 10 commodity imports in 2007 were as follows:

Trading partners of India

India's largest trading partners in alphabetical order are Bangladesh, Bhutan, Germany, Hong Kong, Iraq, Israel, Japan, Nepal, Russia, Saudi Arabia, China, Singapore, Switzerland, the United Arab Emirates and the United States. India is biggest exporter of pharmaceuticals, some food products and is a mixed economy.

See also
 Economy of India
 Foreign relations of India
 Remittances to India 
 Business process outsourcing to India
 List of exports of India
 Largest trading partners of India
 Indian diaspora
 Indianisation

References

External links
 Directorate General of Foreign Trade
 Major Problems Hindering Indias Export Growth
 India Exports and Imports